Motonobu Tanishige (Japanese: 谷繁 元信, born December 21, 1970 in Hiroshima) is a retired Japanese professional baseball player and manager.

Tanishige played 27 seasons in Nippon Professional Baseball (NPB), appearing in more games than any other player in NPB history. Making his debut for the Taiyo Whales in 1989 at age 18, he played for the franchise for 13 years. In 2002, he moved to the Chunichi Dragons, where he played for 14 seasons, until 2015. He was the player-manager of the Chunichi Dragons from 2014 to 2015, staying on as manager in 2016.

Tanishige played in five Japan Series. He played in the 2006 World Baseball Classic, when Japan won the championship.

Professional career
Tanishige performed well in the 2004 Japan Series (which the Dragons lost 4-games-to-3 to the Seibu Lions), including hitting his first career grand slam.

In 2015, Tanishige broke the NPB record for games played, passing Katsuya Nomura with 3,018 — he later extended the record. Tanishige is second on the career strikeout list with 1,838. With more than 200 career home runs, Tanshige is a member of the Meikyukai hall of fame.

Managerial career
After retiring from playing at the end of the 2015 season, Tanishige became full-time manager of the Dragons. After a rocky start to the season followed by a lacklustre continuation following the All-Star break, on August 10, 2016 he was relieved from his duties alongside fielding coach Takahiro Saeki. He was replaced by head coach, Shigekazu Mori for the remainder of the season.

References

External links
 

1970 births
Living people
Baseball people from Hiroshima Prefecture
Japanese baseball players
Nippon Professional Baseball catchers
Yokohama Taiyō Whales players
Yokohama BayStars players
Chunichi Dragons players
2006 World Baseball Classic players
Managers of baseball teams in Japan
Baseball player-managers
Chunichi Dragons managers